Pure McCartney is a live DVD/CD and DVD/2-LP album by singer-songwriters Tim Christensen, Mike Viola, and Tracy Bonham, with the band The Damn Crystals, released in 2013.

Overview 
Pure McCartney contains a recording of a one-off tribute concert at Vega in Copenhagen in celebration of Sir Paul McCartney's 70th birthday that day.

Bassist Søren Koch once saw Viola play in New York, and thought that he had a strong musical match with Christensen, so he introduced the two. Christensen and Viola found out that the 1971 McCartney album Ram is their mutual favorite album, and the idea arose to hold a concert in honor of McCartney's 70th birthday on 18 June 2012. The set list consisted of songs from Ram alongside several other post-Beatles songs. Vega's large concert hall, with a capacity of 1,500, was sold out.

The concert was filmed and released eight months after the show on DVD/CD and DVD/2-LP, featuring artwork inspired by Ram by Paul "Yellow1" Wilson, who has previously done work on several other releases of Christensen and his band Dizzy Mizz Lizzy.

Noel Gallagher was planned to become a surprise guest. Christensen and Gallagher appeared on Danish television, where they were competing in a small quiz about The Beatles. They got along well with each other backstage and also talked about the McCartney concert, but they never heard back from Gallagher's manager.

Track listing

Personnel 

Lead musicians
 Tim Christensen – lead vocals, guitars, producer, executive producer
 Mike Viola – lead vocals, piano, acoustic guitar, bric-à-brac
 Tracy Bonham – lead vocals, violin, percussion

The Damn Crystals
 Lars Skjærbæk – guitars, backing vocals, lead vocal on "Smile Away"
 Søren Koch – bass, backing vocals, additional lead vocal on "Rock Show" and "Coming Up"
 Christoffer Møller – keyboards, backing vocals, percussion, tenor horn
 Jesper Lind – drums

Live crew
 Paul Hammann – FOH engineer
 Daniel Devantier – monitor engineer
 Arild Nordgaard – guitar technician
 Vagn Olsen – drums and bass technician
 Jacob Bækmand – lighting engineer
 Mif Damgaard – head of production, tour manager

Recording, production and post-production
 Frank Birch Pontoppidan – producer, executive producer, mixer (at STC Studios)
 Max Christensen – producer, director
 Morten Fuks – film editor
 Mark Balstrup – color grade
 Paul Wilson – artwork, titles
 Nikolaj Vinten – mastering (at Supersonic Mastering)
 Mads Mølgaard Helbæk – audio engineer
 Sigurd Høyen – photographer
 Jørgen Bo Behrensdorff – photographer
 Mikkel Rise – photographer
 Mads Mølgaard Helbæk – photographer
 Frederik Trampe – photographer
 Morten Fuks – photographer
 Cecilie Bach Pedersen – photographer
 Benni Christiansen – photographer

Notes 

2013 live albums
Live video albums
Mike Viola albums
Tim Christensen albums
Tracy Bonham albums
Tribute albums
Paul McCartney